Hans Neumayer (born 10 January 1956) is a former German racing cyclist. He won the German National Road Race in 1981 and 1982.

References

External links
 

1956 births
Living people
German male cyclists
German cycling road race champions
People from Freising (district)
Sportspeople from Upper Bavaria
Cyclists from Bavaria
20th-century German people